Aiphanes verrucosa is a species of flowering plant in the family Arecaceae. It is found only in Ecuador. Its natural habitat is subtropical or tropical moist montane forests. It is threatened by habitat loss.

References

verrucosa
Endemic flora of Ecuador
Endangered plants
Taxonomy articles created by Polbot